The 2016–17 South of Scotland Football League, was the 71st season of the South of Scotland Football League, and the 3rd season as the sixth tier of the Scottish football pyramid system. St Cuthbert Wanderers were the defending champions.

Edusport Academy won the league and became the first team to be promoted to the Lowland League, as East of Scotland League winners Lothian Thistle Hutchison Vale did not meet the required licensing criteria for promotion and therefore no play-off took place.

Teams
Lochmaben merged with Crichton.

League table

References

5